A standing start is a type of start in auto racing events, in which cars are stationary when the race begins (different to the rolling start, where cars are paced).

Procedure
In a standing start, cars are completely still but with their engines running when the signal is given to start the race. This is often preceded by a set number of lights. Standing starts are common in many motorsports, including most single-seater (Formula 1 and Formula 2 notably), Touring Cars (most notably British and World Touring Cars), drag racing, the Supercars Championship, kart racing, and many types of short-course off-road racing. In a typical standing start, the formation lap takes place, giving time for team personnel to get clear of the starting grid and back into the pit boxes. Once the formation lap is over, all cars position themselves in the order that they qualified, and the Medical Car positions itself behind the pack. Once the Medical Car is in position, a light system consisting of five lights will be shown, and in the process, a marshall walks or runs across the grid while waving a green flag to signal that all cars are correctly positioned. After a predetermined number of seconds, the lights go out, and the race is underway. However, first-lap crashes are common.

American-based series such as IndyCar, NASCAR, and SCCA have traditionally utilized rolling starts. During the 2013 and 2014 seasons, the IndyCar Series adopted a rule for standing starts on a trial basis for selected events. IndyCar dropped the procedure after the 2014 season, due to numerous start aborts and a start-line crash at the 2014 Grand Prix of Indianapolis.

Le Mans

A Le Mans-style start was used for many years in various types of motor racing.  When the start flag dropped, drivers had to run across the track to their cars which were parked on the other side, climb in, start the car, and drive away to begin the race.

Such starts were very unsafe, with drivers possibly rushing the process of fastening their safety equipment. Britain's RAC prohibited the use of the Le Mans start in English racing in late summer 1962 precisely for this reason. In 1969, Jacky Ickx, who always considered this type of start to be dangerous, decided to walk to his car instead of running. Taking the time to secure everything made him effectively start in the last position but nevertheless, he went on to win the race. This staged protest, and the death of John Woolfe in the first lap, at the Maison Blanche curve, precisely because he didn't fasten his seat belt, led to the running start be abolished the following year. As a result, they are no longer used in any motorsport except for endurance motorcycle racing, such as the Suzuka 8 Hours and the 24 Heures Moto, bicycle endurance races, Kinetic Sculpture Races and due to their vulnerability to flameouts, in nitro powered radio-controlled racing, except they are held above ground until start by its mechanics whilst the drivers remain in their stand.

A Le Mans start variation called a "land rush start" is used at short course off-road races at Crandon International Off-Road Raceway where the vehicles start lined up side-by-side on a wide part of the track.  The "land rush start" is based on the 1970 24 Hours of Le Mans start, and is used in historic races at Le Mans in some situations. However, unlike the true Le Mans start, engines are already running and the drivers are already sitting behind the wheel, wearing their safety belts, when the starting signal is displayed.

A second variation is used in the Australian GT Championship invitational Highlands 101 at Highlands Motorsports Park in New Zealand. It integrates both the Le Mans start and the Land Rush start. The driver then starts the car.

Safety and precautions
The alternative to a standing start is a rolling start. Standing starts are often deemed safer in Formula sports, due to the higher acceleration speeds, which could cause problems if a rolling start were used, based on the speed of the safety car and regulations regarding the start (some forms of motorsport are strict on when cars may accelerate after the safety car enters pit lane—some do not permit acceleration until the cars are near the start line at starter's orders). A standing start can cause problems, however, such as stalled cars being hit by drivers who start behind them on the grid. Riccardo Paletti was killed in just such an accident at the 1982 Canadian Grand Prix. Another example was the 2007 Champ Car Mont-Tremblant, where multiple cars stalled on the start, resulting in a safety car. Motorsports using standing starts usually penalize drivers who "jump the start" by moving before the lights are extinguished.

See also
 Rolling start

References

Motorsport terminology
Sports techniques